Aran (known as Kuybishev until 1999) is a village and municipality in the Aghjabadi Rayon of Azerbaijan. It has a population of 1,655.

History 
The village used to be named Kuybışev (English transliteration: Kuybishev) in honor of Valerian Kuybyshev, a Bolshevik revolutionary and Soviet politician. On 1999-10-05, it was renamed Aran.

References 

Populated places in Aghjabadi District